The leader of the Australian Labor Party is the highest political office within the federal Australian Labor Party (ALP). Leaders of the party are chosen from among the sitting members of the parliamentary caucus either by members alone or with a vote of the parties rank-and-file membership. The current leader of the Labor Party, since 2019, is Anthony Albanese, who has served as the prime minister of Australia since 2022. There have been 21 leaders since 1901 when Chris Watson was elected as the inaugural leader following the first federal election.

Every Australian state and territory has its own branch of the Australian Labor Party, which has its own  leader elected from the party members of that jurisdiction.

Background
The federal Labor Caucus comprising the elected members of the Labor party in both Houses of the national Parliament is involved in the election of the federal parliamentary leaders from among its members. The leader has historically been a member of the House of Representatives. Caucus also has the power to dismiss a party leader in a process called a leadership spill. Until 2013, a spill vote could be called at any time and a simple majority of votes in Caucus was sufficient to remove a leader. Following the return of Kevin Rudd to the leadership of the ALP in 2013, he sought changes to the party's rules so that leadership spills would be more difficult to launch in future, including a requirement for 75% majority in Caucus for a leadership spill against a sitting Labor prime minister, or 60% against an opposition leader. The changes also provided for equally weighted voting rights between Caucus and party rank and file members. These changes were adopted by Caucus in July 2013, which was not a change to the party's constitution (and theoretically can be reverted by a simple majority in Caucus). At the October 2013 leadership spill Bill Shorten was the first leader elected under the new rules. Shorten received 55-43 votes in Caucus, which was sufficient to overcome his 40% support among party members.

When the Labor Party is in government, the party leader becomes the Prime Minister and the deputy leader becomes the Deputy Prime Minister. If a Labor prime minister resigns or dies in office, the deputy leader becomes party leader and is sworn in as prime minister on an interim basis until a party successor is elected. This was the case upon the death in office of John Curtin on 5 July 1945. Frank Forde, the deputy party leader, was sworn in as interim prime minister until Ben Chifley was elected by Caucus as party leader on 13 July. If the leader is out of the country or is on leave, the deputy leader acts as party leader and prime minister, without being sworn into the office.

According to recent convention, the leader and deputy leader must be from different factions and from different states. The leadership and deputy leadership have also been gender-balanced.

Federal leadership

Leader
The federal Leaders of the Australian Labor Party have been as follows (acting leaders indicated in italics):

{| class="wikitable sortable" style="text-align:center"
! #
! colspan=2| Leader
! Electorate
! Term start
! Term end
! Time in office
! colspan=2|Prime Minister 
|-
| rowspan=5|1
| rowspan=5|
| rowspan=5|
| rowspan=5|Bland(1901–1906);South Sydney(1906–1910)
| rowspan=5|
| rowspan=5|
| rowspan=5|
| style="background-color: |
! style="font-weight:normal"|Barton 
|-
| style="background-color: |
! style="font-weight:normal"|Deakin 
|-
| style="background-color: |
| Himself 
|-
| style="background-color: |
! style="font-weight:normal"|Reid 
|-
| style="background-color: ; border-top:solid 0 gray; border-bottom:solid 0 gray" |
! rowspan=2 style="font-weight:normal"|Deakin 
|-
| rowspan=6|2
| rowspan=6|
| rowspan=6|
| rowspan=6|Wide Bay
| rowspan=6|
| rowspan=6|
| rowspan=6|
| height=50 style="background-color: ; border-top:solid 0 gray" |
|-
| style="background-color: |
| Himself 
|-
| style="background-color: |
! style="font-weight:normal"|Deakin 
|-
| style="background-color: |
| Himself 
|-
| style="background-color: |
! style="font-weight:normal"|Cook 
|-
| style="background-color: |
| Himself 
|-
| 3
| 
| 
| West Sydney
| 
| 
| 
| style="background-color: |
| Himself 
|-
| rowspan=2|4
| rowspan=2|
| rowspan=2|
| rowspan=2|Yarra
| rowspan=2|
| rowspan=2|†
| rowspan=2|
| style="background-color: |
! style="font-weight:normal"|Hughes 
|-
| style="background-color: ; border-top:solid 0 gray; border-bottom:solid 0 gray" |
! rowspan=3 style="font-weight:normal"|Hughes 
|-
| rowspan=3|5
| rowspan=3|
| rowspan=3|
| rowspan=3|Hunter
| 
| 
| 
| style="background-color: ; border-top:solid 0 gray; border-bottom:solid 0 gray" |
|-
| rowspan=2|
| rowspan=2|
| rowspan=2|
| style="background-color: ; border-top:solid 0 gray" |
|-
| style="background-color: ; border-top:solid 0 gray; border-bottom:solid 0 gray" |
! rowspan=2 style="font-weight:normal"|Bruce 
|-
| rowspan=3|6
| rowspan=3|
| rowspan=3|
| rowspan=3|Yarra
| rowspan=3|
| rowspan=3|
| rowspan=3|
| style="background-color: ; border-top:solid 0 gray" |
|-
| style="background-color: |
| Himself 
|-
| style="background-color: ; border-bottom:solid 0 gray" |
! rowspan=2 style="font-weight:normal"|Lyons 
|-
| rowspan=5|7
| rowspan=5|
| rowspan=5|
| rowspan=5|Fremantle
| rowspan=5|
| rowspan=5|†
| rowspan=5|
| style="background-color: ; border-top:solid 0 gray" |
|-
| style="background-color: |
! style="font-weight:normal"|Page 
|-
| style="background-color: |
! style="font-weight:normal"|Menzies 
|-
| style="background-color: |
! style="font-weight:normal"|Fadden 
|-
| style="background-color: |
| Himself 
|-
| –<ref>Prime Ministers of Australia: Frank Forde. National Museum of Australia. Retrieved 22 August 2018.</ref>
| 
| | Capricornia| | | | style="background-color: |
| Himself 
|-
| rowspan=2|8
| rowspan=2|
| rowspan=2|
| rowspan=2|Macquarie
| rowspan=2|
| rowspan=2|†
| rowspan=2|
| style="background-color: |
| Himself 
|-
| style="background-color: ; border-bottom:solid 0 gray" |
! rowspan=3 style="font-weight:normal"|Menzies 
|-
| 9
| 
| 
| Barton(1940–1958);Hunter(1958–1960)
| 
| 
| 
| style="background-color: ; border-bottom:solid 0 gray; border-top:solid 0 gray" |
|-
| rowspan=2|10
| rowspan=2|
| rowspan=2|
| rowspan=2| Melbourne
| rowspan=2|
| rowspan=2|
| rowspan=2|
|style="background-color: ; border-bottom:solid 0 gray; border-top:solid 0 gray" |
|-
| style="background-color: ; border-bottom:solid 0 gray" |
! rowspan=2 style="font-weight:normal"|Holt 
|-
| rowspan=6|11
| rowspan=6|
| rowspan=6|
| rowspan=6|Werriwa
| rowspan=6|
| rowspan=6|
| rowspan=6|
|style="background-color: ; border-bottom:solid 0 gray; border-top:solid 0 gray" |
|-
| style="background-color: |
! style="font-weight:normal"|McEwen 
|-
| style="background-color: |
! style="font-weight:normal"|Gorton 
|-
| style="background-color: |
! style="font-weight:normal"|McMahon 
|-
| style="background-color: |
| Himself 
|-
| style="background-color: ; border-bottom:solid 0 gray" |
! rowspan=3 style="font-weight:normal"|Fraser 
|-
| 12
| 
| 
| Oxley
| 
| 
| 
| style="background-color: ; border-top:solid 0 gray; border-bottom:solid 0 gray" |
|- 
| rowspan=2|13
| rowspan=2|
| rowspan=2|
| rowspan=2|Wills
| rowspan=2|
| rowspan=2|
| rowspan=2|
| style="background-color: ; border-top:solid 0 gray; border-bottom:solid 0 gray" |
|- 
| style="background-color: |
| Himself 
|-
| 14
| 
| 
| Blaxland
| 
| 
| 
| style="background-color: |
| Himself 
|-
| 15
| 
| 
| Brand
| 
| 
| 
| style="background-color: ; border-top:solid 0 gray; border-bottom:solid 0 gray" |
! rowspan=5 style="font-weight:normal"|Howard 
|-
| 16
| 
| 
| Hotham
| 
| 
| 
| style="background-color: ; border-top:solid 0 gray; border-bottom:solid 0 gray" |
|-
| 17
| 
| 
| Werriwa
| 
| 
| 
| style="background-color: ; border-top:solid 0 gray; border-bottom:solid 0 gray" |
|-
| (15)
| 
| 
| Brand
| 
| 
| 
| style="background-color: ; border-top:solid 0 gray; border-bottom:solid 0 gray" |
|-
| rowspan=2|18
| rowspan=2|
| rowspan=2|
| rowspan=2|Griffith
| rowspan=2|
| rowspan=2|
| rowspan=2|
| style="background-color: ; border-top:solid 0 gray; border-bottom:solid 0 gray" |
|-
| style="background-color: |
| Himself 
|-
| 19
| 
| 
| Lalor
| 
| 
| 
| style="background-color: |
| Herself 
|-
| (18)
| 
| 
| Griffith
| 
| 
| 
| style="background-color: |
| Himself 
|-
| –
| 
| | McMahon| | | | style="background-color: ; border-top:solid 0 gray; border-bottom:solid 0 gray" |
! rowspan=2 style="font-weight:normal"|Abbott 
|-
| rowspan=3|20
| rowspan=3|
| rowspan=3|
| rowspan=3|Maribyrnong
| rowspan=3|
| rowspan=3|
| rowspan=3|
| style="background-color: ; border-top:solid 0 gray" |
|-
| style="background-color: |
! style="font-weight:normal"|Turnbull 
|-
| style="background-color: ; border-bottom:solid 0 gray"|
! rowspan=2 style="font-weight:normal"|Morrison 
|-
| rowspan=2|21
| rowspan=2|
| rowspan=2|
| rowspan=2|Grayndler
| rowspan=2|
| rowspan=2|Incumbent
| rowspan=2|
| style="background-color: ; border-top:solid 0 gray; border-bottom:solid 0 gray" |
|-
| style="background-color: |
| Himself 
|}

Deputy LeaderShown in chronological order of leadership''

Senate Leader

State leadership

Australian Capital Territory

 Rosemary Follett (1989, 1991–1995, inaugural Chief Minister of the ACT, and first female head of government of an Australian state or territory)
 Jon Stanhope (2001–2011)
 Katy Gallagher (2011–2014)

New South Wales

 James McGowen (1910–1913)
 William Holman (1913–1916)
 John Storey (1920–21)
 James Dooley (1921, 1921–22)
 Jack Lang (1925–1927, 1930–1932)
 William McKell (1941–1947)
 James McGirr (1947–1952)
 Joseph Cahill (1952–1959)
 Bob Heffron (1959–1964)
 Jack Renshaw (1964–65)
 Neville Wran (1976–1986)
 Barrie Unsworth (1986–1988)
 Bob Carr (1995–2005)
 Morris Iemma (2005–2008)
 Nathan Rees (2008–09)
 Kristina Keneally (2009–2011, first female premier of New South Wales)

Northern Territory

 Clare Martin (2001–2007, first Labor Chief Minister of the Northern Territory, first female Chief Minister of the Northern Territory)
 Paul Henderson (2007–2012)

Queensland

 Anderson Dawson (1899, world's first leader of a parliamentary socialist government)
 T. J. Ryan (1915–1919)
 Ted Theodore (1919–1925)
 William Gillies (1925)
 William McCormack (1925–1929)
 William Forgan Smith (1932–1942)
 Frank Cooper (1942–1946)
 Ned Hanlon (1946–1952)
 Vince Gair (1952–1957)
 Wayne Goss (1989–1996)
 Peter Beattie (1998–2007)
 Anna Bligh (2007–2012, first female premier of Queensland, and first woman in Australia to win an election as premier)

South Australia

 Thomas Price (1905–1909)
 John Verran (1910–1912)
 Crawford Vaughan (1915–1917)
 John Gunn (1924–1926)
 Lionel Hill (1926–27, 1930–1933)
 Robert Richards (1933)
 Frank Walsh (1965–1967)
 Don Dunstan (1967–68, 1970–1979)
 Des Corcoran (1979)
 John Bannon (1982–1992)
 Lynn Arnold (1992–93)
 Mike Rann (2002–2011)
 Jay Weatherill (2011–2018)

Tasmania

 John Earle (1909, 1914–1916)
 Joseph Lyons (1923–1928)
 Albert Ogilvie (1934–1939)
 Edmund Dwyer-Gray (1939)
 Robert Cosgrove (1939–1947, 1948–1958)
 Edward Brooker (1947–48)
 Eric Reece (1958–1969, 1972–1975)
 Bill Neilson (1975–1977)
 Doug Lowe (1977–1981)
 Harry Holgate (1981–82)
 Michael Field (1989–1992)
 Jim Bacon (1998–2004)
 Paul Lennon (2004–2008)
 David Bartlett (2008–2011)
 Lara Giddings (2011–2014, first female Premier of Tasmania)

Victoria

 George Elmslie (1913)
 George Prendergast (1924)
 Edmond Hogan (1927–28, 1929–1932)
 John Cain (34th Premier of Victoria) (1943, 1945–1947, 1952–1955)
 John Cain (41st Premier of Victoria) (1982–1990)
 Joan Kirner (1990–1992, first female premier of Victoria)
 Steve Bracks (1999–2007)
 John Brumby (2007–2010)

Western Australia

 Henry Daglish (1904–05)
 John Scaddan (1911–1916)
 Philip Collier (1924–1930, 1933–1936)
 John Willcock (1936–1945)
 Frank Wise (1945–1947)
 Albert Hawke (1953–1959)
 John Tonkin (1971–1974)
 Brian Burke (1983–1988)
 Peter Dowding (1988–1990)
 Carmen Lawrence (1990–1993, first female premier of an Australian state)
 Geoff Gallop (2001–2006)
 Alan Carpenter (2006–2008)

References

 
Australian Labor Party federal leaders
Australian Labor Party federal leaders by time served
 
Labor Party Australia